No Pain No Gain is an album by the Ghetto Twiinz. It was released in 1998 through Rap-A-Lot Records and Noo Trybe Records, and contained production from Leroy "Precise" Edwards, Mike Dean and J. Prince.  No Pain No Gain was the Ghetto Twiinz most successful album, making it to No. 191 on the Billboard 200. The album also made it to No. 35 on the Top R&B/Hip-Hop Albums and No. 15 on the Top Heatseekers charts.

Track listing
"War (Intro)"- 1:33  
"Soldier Song"- 5:20 (Featuring DMG & Yukmouth) 
"Die "MF" Die"- 4:09 (Featuring 007)  
"A Mil Don't Make U Real"- 4:35  
"No Sunshine"- 6:08 (Featuring Scarface) 
"No Pain, No Gain"- 5:02 (Featuring Mia X) 
"Smokin' Love"- 4:10  
"Stop Playin'"- 5:21  (Featuring Tela)
"Got It on My Mind"- 3:34  
"You Don't Wanna (Go to War)"- 4:29 (Featuring Lo-Life & Willie D) 
"Gonna Be a Murda"- 3:45  
"B's Jack Too"- 3:32  
"Bout Dat Gangsta Gangsta"- 5:04 (Featuring 2-4 of Snypaz & G Mone' Of A-G-2-A-Ke) 
"Livin' Ghetto"- 5:57 (Featuring Willie D) 
"Responsibility (Remix)"- 4:44  (Featuring D. Shype)
"Small Time (Remix)"- 4:11  (Featuring Gotti of FWC)
"Ms. Ghetto News/War (Outro)"- 2:48

References

1998 albums
Ghetto Twiinz albums